Kudos was a milk chocolate granola cereal bar produced by Mars, Incorporated. 

When initially launched in 1986, there were three varieties: nutty fudge, chocolate chip, and peanut butter. The original formulation of the bar was much more candy bar-like with less focus on the granola, although the original intention was to offer a healthier candy bar alternative.

The original slogan was "Kudos, I'm yours!"

Mars, Incorporated, stated in a 2017 Facebook post that the bars had officially been discontinued. As of 2020, there were no plans to revive the product.

References

Products introduced in 1986
Brand name snack foods
Cereal bars
Mars confectionery brands